Grzegorz Korcz (born 9 October 1946) is a Polish former basketball player. He competed in the men's tournament at the 1968 Summer Olympics, and the 1972 Summer Olympics.

References

1946 births
Living people
Polish men's basketball players
Olympic basketball players of Poland
Basketball players at the 1968 Summer Olympics
Basketball players at the 1972 Summer Olympics